Paavo ("Pekka") Johansson (later Jaale) (21 October 1895, in Helsinki – 5 December 1983) was a Finnish athlete who competed mainly in the javelin throw.

Johansson competed for Finland in the 1920 Summer Olympics held in Antwerp, Belgium, winning the bronze behind Jonni Myyrä and Urho Peltonen and ahead of Julius Saaristo as Finland claimed the first four spots. He also took part in the decathlon, but dropped out after the first day. He returned to Olympics four years later at Paris, this time competing only in the javelin, but failed to make the six man final.

He also played football as a forward. He made one appearance for the Finland national team in 1919.

References

1895 births
1983 deaths
Athletes from Helsinki
Finnish male javelin throwers
Olympic bronze medalists for Finland
Athletes (track and field) at the 1920 Summer Olympics
Athletes (track and field) at the 1924 Summer Olympics
Olympic athletes of Finland
Medalists at the 1920 Summer Olympics
Olympic bronze medalists in athletics (track and field)
Olympic decathletes
Finnish footballers
Finland international footballers
Association football forwards